Alexander Thomas Embury (12 January 1874 – 19 July 1956) was a Conservative member of the House of Commons of Canada. He was born in Lennox County, Ontario and became a physician.

Embury attended school at Napanee Collegiate, then earned his medical degrees (MD, CM) at Queen's University. In 1921, he was a warden of Hastings County.

He was first elected to Parliament at the Hastings—Peterborough riding in the 1925 general election then re-elected in 1926 and 1930. Embury was defeated by Rork Scott Ferguson of the Liberals in the 1935 election.

References

External links
 

1874 births
1956 deaths
Physicians from Ontario
Conservative Party of Canada (1867–1942) MPs
Members of the House of Commons of Canada from Ontario
Queen's University at Kingston alumni